Seibel may refer to: 
 Albert Seibel (1844–1936), a French physician and viticulturist 
 Cathy Seibel (1960–), an American federal judge
 Carl-August Seibel (1872–1950), the founder of the German shoe industry
 Edgar Seibel (born 1991), a Russian-born German writer and journalist
 Felix Seibel (born 1997), a Russian-born German skeleton racer
 John Seibel (1970–), an American journalist who has worked for ESPN
 Josef Seibel (1923–2014), a German industrialist  
 Kevin Seibel (born 1983), a Canadian professional ice hockey defenceman
 Klauspeter Seibel (1936–2011), a German conductor of the Louisiana Philharmonic Orchestra
 Markus J Seibel (1958 – ), a German-Australian scientist and endocrinologist
 Phil Seibel (1979–), a former left-handed starting/relief baseball pitcher
 Tara Seibel (1973–), an American artist (cartoonist) 

Seibels may refer to:
 Edwin G. Seibels (1866–1954), the inventor of the vertical filing system
 Henry Seibels (−1876), an American football player
Surnames from given names